, abbreviated as OVA and sometimes as OAV (original animation video), are Japanese animated films and series made specially for release in home video formats without prior showings on television or in theaters, though the first part of an OVA series may be broadcast for promotional purposes. OVA titles were originally made available on VHS, later becoming more popular on LaserDisc and eventually DVD.  Starting in 2008, the term OAD (original animation DVD) began to refer to DVD releases published bundled with their source-material manga.

Format
Like anime made for television broadcast, OVAs are sub-divided into episodes. OVA media (tapes, laserdiscs or DVDs) usually contain just one episode each. Episode length varies from title to title: each episode may run from a few minutes to two hours or more. An episode length of 30 minutes occurs quite commonly, but no standard length exists. In some cases, the length of episodes in a specific OVA may vary greatly, for example in GaoGaiGar FINAL, the first 7 episodes last around 30 minutes, while the last episode lasts 50 minutes; the OVA Key the Metal Idol consists of 15 separate episodes, ranging in length from 20 minutes to nearly two hours each; The OVA Hellsing Ultimate had released 10 episodes, ranging from 42 minutes to 56 minutes. An OVA series can run anywhere from a single episode (essentially a direct-to-video movie) to dozens of episodes in length. The longest OVA series ever made, Legend of the Galactic Heroes, spanned 110 main episodes and 52 gaiden episodes.

Many popular series first appear animated as an OVA, and later grow to become television series or movies. Tenchi Muyo!, for example, began as an OVA but went on to spawn several TV series, three movies, and numerous other spin-offs. Producers make other OVA releases as sequels, side stories, music-video collections, or bonus episodes that continue existing as television series or films, such as Love Hina Again and Wolf's Rain.

OVA titles generally have a much higher budget per episode than in a television series; therefore the technical quality of animation can generally surpass that in television series; occasionally it even equals that of animated movies.

OVA titles have a reputation for detailed plots and character-development, which can result from the greater creative freedom offered to writers and directors relative to other formats. This also allows for animated adaptations of manga to reflect their source material more faithfully. Since OVA episodes and series have no fixed conventional length, OVA directors can use however much time they like to tell the story. Time becomes available to expand upon significant background, character, and plot development. This contrasts with television episodes (which must end somewhere between 22 and 26 minutes) and with films (which rarely last more than two hours). In the same way, no pressure exists to produce "filler content" to extend a short plot into a full television series. The producers of OVA titles generally target a specific audience, rather than the more mass-market audience of films and television series, or may feel less constrained by content-restrictions and censorship (such as for violence, nudity, and language) often placed on television series. For example, the Kiss×sis OVA series generally contains more sexual themes than its television counterpart.

Much OVA-production aims at an audience of male anime enthusiasts. Bandai Visual stated in a 2004 news release (for their new OVAs aimed at women) that about 50% of the customers who had bought their anime DVDs in the past fell into the category of 25- to 40-year-old men, with only 13% of purchasers women, even with all ages included. These statistics cover Bandai Visual anime DVDs in general, not just OVAs, but they show the general tendency at this point. Nikkei Business Publications also stated in a news-release that mainly 25- to 40-year-old adults bought anime DVDs. Few OVAs specifically target female audiences, but Earthian exemplifies the exceptions.

Some OVAs based on television series (and especially those based on manga) may provide closure to the plot – closure not present in the original series. The Rurouni Kenshin OVAs, to name one series, exemplified numerous aspects of OVAs; they were slightly based on chapters of the author Nobuhiro Watsuki's manga that had not been adapted into the anime television series, had higher-quality animation, were much more violent, and were executed in a far more dark and realistic style than the TV episodes or the manga.

Dark realism featured in Masami Kurumada's famous manga Saint Seiya. The anime adapted two of the three arcs in Kurumada's manga—the project to adapt the third arc to the anime never started. As Kurumada had completed his manga in 1991, its third act was finally adapted to anime, releasing the episodes as OVAs, starting in 2003 and finishing in 2008, at last adapting Kurumada's manga completely to anime.

Most OVA titles run for four to eight episodes, and some only have one. They tend to have a complex and continuous plot, best enjoyed if all episodes are viewed in sequence. This contrasts with television series which may either feature short, related "mini-stories" or exist without a unified plot. Many OVA titles can be thought of as "long films" that just happen to be released in parts. Release schedules vary: some series may progress as slowly as 1–2 episodes per year. Some OVA titles with a lengthy release-schedule ended up unfinished due to lack of fan support and sales.

Many one-episode OVAs exist as well. Typically, such an OVA provides a side-story to a popular TV series (such as Detective Conan OVAs). At an early stage in the history of the OVA (1980s) many one-episode OVAs appeared. Hundreds of manga that were popular but not enough to gain TV series were granted one-shot (or otherwise extremely short) OVA episodes. When these one-shot OVAs prove popular enough, a network can use the OVA as a pilot to an anime series.

History

OVAs originated during the early 1980s. As the VCR became a widespread fixture in Japanese homes, the Japanese anime industry grew to behemoth proportions. Demand for anime became massive, so much so that consumers would willingly go directly to video stores to buy new animation outright. While people in the United States use the phrase "direct-to-video" as a pejorative for works that could not make it onto television or movie screens, in Japan the demand was so great that direct-to-video became a necessity. Many popular and influential series such as Bubblegum Crisis (1987–1991) and Tenchi Muyo! (1992–2005) were released directly to video as OVAs.

The earliest known attempt to release an OVA involved Osamu Tezuka's The Green Cat (part of the Lion Books series) in 1983, although it cannot count as the first OVA: there is no evidence that the VHS tape became available immediately and the series remained incomplete. Therefore, the first official OVA release to be billed as such was 1983's Dallos, directed by Mamoru Oshii and released by Bandai. Other famous early OVAs, premiering shortly thereafter, were Fight! Iczer One and the original Megazone 23. Other companies were quick to pick up on the idea, and the mid-to-late 1980s saw the market flooded with OVAs. During this time, most OVA series were new, stand-alone titles.

In the 1980s during Japan's economic bubble, production companies were more than willing to spontaneously decide to make a one- or two-part OVA. They paid money to anime studios, who then haphazardly created an OVA to be released to rental shops. Judging from sales, should a longer series be deemed feasible, TV networks paid for most of the production costs of the entire series.

As the Japanese economy worsened in the 1990s, the flood of new OVA titles diminished to a trickle. Production of OVAs continued, but in smaller numbers. Many anime television series ran an economical 13 episodes rather than the traditional 26-episodes per season. New titles were often designed to be released to TV if they approached these lengths. In addition, the rising popularity of cable and satellite TV networks (with their typically less strict censorship rules) allowed the public to see direct broadcasts of many new titles—something that previously would have been impossible. Therefore, many violent, risque, and fan service series became regular TV series, when previously those titles would have been OVAs. During this time period most OVA content was limited to that related to existing and established titles.

However, in 2000 and later, a new OVA trend began. Producers released many TV series without normal broadcasts of all of the episodes—but releasing some episodes on the DVD release of the series. Examples of this include the DVD-only 25th episode of Love Hina, while several episodes of the Oh My Goddess TV series are DVD-only. In addition, the final episode of Excel Saga was offered only as an OVA, mostly due to content issues that would have made TV broadcast impossible. In these cases the series as a whole cannot be called an OVA, though certain episodes are. This trend is becoming quite common, and furthermore, many recent OVA series pre-broadcast the episodes and release the DVD with unedited and better quality, along with revised animations—thus further blurring the boundary between TV and video anime.

See also

 Direct-to-video
 Original net animation

References

Anime and manga terminology